This is a list of mnemonics related to firefighting or rescue.

Mnemonics
Incident priorities

LSP

Life safety

Stabilize incident

Property conservation

Fire scene priorities
RECEO - SV

Rescue victims

Exposures - stop fire spread

Confine - contain the fire

Extinguish

Overhaul - check for hidden fire spread

- targets of opportunity:

Salvage

Vent

Company Officer Checklist For Report On Conditions

SLICERS

Size up

Locate seat of fire

Identify flow path

Cool from safe distance

Extinguish fire

Rescue

Salvage

First attack response
RACE (General first response to a fire.)

Rescue - move people who are in immediate danger.

Alarm - raise the alarm and alert persons to the presence of fire.

Confine - shut doors and reduce airflow and fuel sources to the fire, to reduce its spread.

Extinguish or Evacuate - extinguish the fire if it's safe to do so, or coordinate the evacuation from the area.

Response phases
TRIPOD (
The six different possible primary phases of a fire response.)

Transitional - moving from an offensive attack to a defensive position.

Rescue - victim rescue

Investigating

Preparing

Offensive

Defensive

Wildland firefighting safety
PLACES

-Safety checklist

PPE

Lookouts

Awareness

Communications

Escape routes

Safety zones

Fire safety
EDITH
(A life-safety home education program.)

Exit

Drills

In

The

Home

Hazmat Placards

EGFFOPRCO

(Every Good Fire Fighter Occasionally Provides Real Cool Orgasms)

1.    Explosives

2.    Gas (flammable)

3.    Flammable Liquids

4.    Flammable Solids

5.    Oxidizers

6.    Poisons/Toxics

7.    Radioactives

8.    Corrosives

9.    Other Regulated Materials/Miscellaneous

How to use a fire extinguisher
PASS (Fire extinguisher use education for everyone)

Pull the pin

Aim at the base of the fire

Squeeze the handle or lever

Sweep from side to side

See also
 List of medical mnemonics (Includes EMS mnemonics)

References

Science-related lists
Mnemonics
Mnemonics